Anna Swanson is a Canadian poet.

In May 2011, Swanson received a Lambda Literary Award for Lesbian Poetry for her debut poetry collection, The Nights Also. In June, she received the Gerald Lampert Award for Best First Book of Poetry.

References

External links
annaswanson.ca

21st-century Canadian poets
Canadian women poets
Canadian lesbian writers
Living people
Lambda Literary Award for Lesbian Poetry winners
Canadian LGBT poets
21st-century Canadian women writers
Year of birth missing (living people)
21st-century Canadian LGBT people